Tristram Ogilvie Cary, OAM (14 May 192524 April 2008), was a pioneering English-Australian composer. He was also active as a teacher and music critic.

Career
Cary was born in Oxford, England, and educated at the Dragon School in Oxford and Westminster School in London. He was the third son and child of a pianist and the Ulster-born novelist Joyce Cary, author of Mister Johnson. While working as a radar engineer for the Royal Navy during World War II, he independently developed his own conception of electronic and tape music, and is regarded as being amongst the earliest pioneers of these musical forms.

Following World War II, he created one of the first electronic music studios, later travelling around Europe to meet the small numbers of other early pioneers of electronic music and composition. He studied arts at the University of Oxford and went on to study composition, conducting, piano, viola and horn at Trinity College London.

With Peter Zinovieff and David Cockerell, he founded Electronic Music Studios (London) Ltd, which created the first commercially available portable synthesiser, the EMS VCS 3, and was then involved in the production of such distinctive EMS products as the EMS Synthi 100.

In 1967 he created an electronic music studio at the Royal College of Music. This led to an invitation from the University of Melbourne in 1973 for a lecture tour, which in turn led to an invitation to become the Visiting Composer at the University of Adelaide in 1974. He remained there as a lecturer until 1986. He also wrote music criticism for The Australian.

Musical works
His concert works of note include a Sonata for guitar (1959), Continuum for tape (1969), a cantata Peccata Mundi (1972), Contours and Densities at First Hill for orchestra (1972), a Nonet (1979), String Quartet No. 2 (1985) and The Dancing Girls for orchestra (1991).

Cary is also particularly well known for his film and television music. He wrote music for the science fiction television series Doctor Who (including the first Dalek story<ref>Chris Thomas, Music-maker for the Daleks, p. 41, The West Australian, 12 May 2008.</ref>), as well as the score for the Ealing comedy The Ladykillers (1955). Later film scores included The Boy Who Stole a Million (1960); The Prince and The Pauper (1962); Sammy Going South (1963); Quatermass and the Pit (1967) and Blood from the Mummy's Tomb (1971), both for Hammer. He also composed the score for the ABC TV animated version of A Christmas Carol. and the children's animated special Katya and the Nutcracker.

Cary was one of the first British composers to work in musique concrète. In 1967 he created the first electronic music studio of the Royal College of Music. He built another at his home in Suffolk, which he transported to Australia when he emigrated there, and incorporated it into the University of Adelaide where he worked as a lecturer until 1986.

He provided the visual design for the EMS VCS3 synthesizer.

Death
Cary died in Adelaide, South Australia, on 24 April 2008, aged 82.

Honours
Cary won the 1977 Albert H. Maggs Composition Award. He was awarded the Medal of the Order of Australia in 1991 in recognition of service to music. He also received the 2005 lifetime achievement award from the Adelaide Critics' Circle for his contribution to music in England and Australia.

List of works
Orchestral/ChoralPeccata Mundi for Chorus, Orchestra, Speaking voice, Four tracks of tape (1972/76),Contours & Densities at First Hill – Fifteen Landscapes for Orchestra (1976)The Dancing Girls Four Mobiles for Orchestra (1991)Sevens Concertino for Yamaha Disklavier and Strings (1991)Inside Stories for chamber orchestra and prerecorded CD (1993)The Ladykillers Suite for Orchestra (1955/96)

Chamber/SoloSonata for Guitar Alone (1959)Three Threes and One Make Ten Mixed decet (1961)Narcissus for Flute and two tape recorders (1968)Trios for VCS3 Synthesiser and two turntables (1971)Romantic Interiors for violin, cello and tape (1973)Family Conference for four clarinets (1981)Seeds Mixed Quintet (1982)String Quartet No.2 (1985)Rivers Four percussionists and two tape recorders (1986)Black, White & Rose Marimba and tape (1991)Strange Places Piano solo (1992)Messages Cello solo (1993)Through Glass Piano and electronics (1998)

VocalDivertimento (1973) – for Olivetti machines, 16 singers and jazz drummer (1973) (10') Commissioned by Olivetti for the opening of a new training centre at Haslemere, England (designed by the world-famous architect James Stirling) as (a) part of a 'Venetian' concert conducted by Cary himself, and (b) the sound track of a film. Described by Cary as "friendly, undemanding music" which nevertheless he was nervous about performing, since the audience was composed of VIPs and included Yehudi Menuhin. The text of the piece consists of cardinal numbers in four languages. The performance: Premiered 21 June 1973 at Haslemere HQ of Olivetti, though the film version had already been previously recorded. Performed again in Adelaide 1974. Cary also extracted a piece from it without vocals – "Tracks from Divertimento" – in 1978. It is published on a disc – "Full Spectrum" (MOVE Records MS3027). The original Haslemere personnel were the Ambrosian Singers and Chris Karan (drums).Two Nativity Songs from the Piae Cantiones (arr.) (1979)I Am Here Soprano and Tape (1980)Earth Hold Songs Soprano and Piano (1993)Songs for Maid Marian Soprano, Piano (1959/98)

Electroacoustic

For analogue tape
Suite – the Japanese Fishermen (1955)
4 5 – A Study in Limited Resources (1967)
Birth is Life is Power is Death is God is....(1967)
Continuum (1969)
Suite – Leviathan '99 (1972)
Steam Music (1978)

For computer
Nonet (1979)
Soft Walls (1980)
Trellises (1984)
The Impossible Piano (1994)

FilmsThe Ladykillers, Ealing Studios (1955)Town on Trial, Columbia (1957)Time Without Pity, Harlequin (1957)The Flesh Is Weak (1957)Tread Softly Stranger (1958)
 She Didn't Say No! (1958)The Little Island, Richard Williams (1958) (best experimental film, Venice 1958; best experimental film, British Film Academy 1959)The Boy Who Stole a Million (dir. Charles Crichton) (1960)The Prince and The Pauper (dir. Don Chaffey) (1962)Sammy Going South, Michael Balcon (1963) (Royal Command Film Performance 1963)The Silent Playground (1963)EXPO 67 Montréal – All film soundtracks for Industrial Section, British Pavilion (1967)A la Mesure de l'Homme, Canadian Government (1967)Quatermass and the Pit, Hammer Films (1967)A Twist of Sand, United Artists (1968)Blood from the Mummy's Tomb, Hammer Films (1971)A Christmas Carol, ABC Films (1972) (Academy Award for Best Animated Short Film)The Fourth Wish, ABC (1976)Katya and the Nutcracker: special arrangement of Tchaikovsky's Nutcracker Ballet for a 30' children's animated film (John Cary Films / Minotaur International)

RadioThe Children of Lir (Craig) (1959)La Machine Infernale (Cocteau) (1960)The End of Fear (Saurat) (1960)King Lear (Shakespeare) (1960)The Flight of the Wild Geese (Dillon) (1961)The Ballad of Peckham Rye (Spark) (1962) Italia PrizeThe Ha-Ha (Dawson) (1963)The Rhyme of the Flying Bomb (Peake) (1964)

TelevisionJane Eyre (Brontë) (1963)The Daleks (Doctor Who serial) (1963) (also reused in The Rescue (1965), The Daleks' Master Plan (1966), The Ark (1966) & The Power of the Daleks (1966))Madame Bovary (Flaubert) (1964)
 The Ordeal of Richard Feverel (1964)Marco Polo (Doctor Who serial) (1964)Mill on the Floss (Eliot) (1964)The Head Waiter (Mortimer) (1966)The Daleks' Master Plan (Doctor Who serial) (1966) (also reused in The Power of the Daleks (1966))The Gunfighters (Doctor Who serial) (1966)The Paradise Makers (Winch) (1967)The Million Pound Banknote (Twain) (1968)Sinister Street (Mackenzie) (1969)The Mutants (Doctor Who serial) (1972)

Theatre and miscellaneousMacbeth Old Vic Theatre (1960)Henry IV, Pt.I Old Vic Theatre (1961)La Contessa (Druon, dir: Helpmann) (1965)Die Ballade von Peckham Rye Salzburg Festival (1965)Escalator Music and Centre Music EXPO 67, MontrealHamlet Theatre Roundabout, (1968)Music for Light Olympia London (1968)"H" (Wood) National Theatre (1969)Echoes till Sunset – 3-hour open air entertainment, Adelaide Festival (1984)

BooksDictionary of Musical Technology (1992) (also known as the Illustrated Compendium of Musical Technology)

References

Published references
Oliver, Michael. "Miscellany: Justin Connolly – Jonathan Harvey – Roger Smalley – Anthony Payne – Tristram Cary – Anthony Milner – Christopher Headington – Robin Holloway – David Ellis" in British Music Now: A Guide to the Work of Younger Composers, ed. Lewis Foreman, 1975. London: Paul Elek. The New Grove Dictionary of Music and Musicians Macmillan 1980The Grove Concise Dictionary of Music Macmillan 1988New Oxford Companion to Music Oxford University Press 1983The Oxford Companion to Australian Music Oxford University Press 1997Dictionary of 20th Century Music Thames & Hudson 1974Halliwell's Who's Who in the Movies'' HarperCollins (freq. reprinted)

External links
Tristram Cary At Trunk Records
Interview with Tristram Cary

Australian Music Centre
Australasian Performing Right Association
Story about Tristram Cary in the University of Adelaide's Lumen magazine
Telegraph article
University of Adelaide obituary
Tristram Cary in AusStage
Reminiscence of an incident during naval service, spoken by Cary

1925 births
2008 deaths
Musicians from Oxford
People educated at The Dragon School
People educated at Westminster School, London
Alumni of Christ Church, Oxford
Alumni of Trinity College of Music
Academic staff of the University of Adelaide
20th-century classical composers
20th-century British conductors (music)
English male classical composers
English classical composers
English electronic musicians
English conductors (music)
British male conductors (music)
English film score composers
English male film score composers
21st-century classical composers
21st-century British conductors (music)
English emigrants to Australia
Naturalised citizens of Australia
British expatriates in Australia
Recipients of the Medal of the Order of Australia
Royal Navy personnel of World War II
Royal Navy sailors
Australian male classical composers
Australian classical composers
Australian electronic musicians
Australian conductors (music)
Australian film score composers
20th-century Australian musicians
20th-century English composers
21st-century Australian musicians
21st-century English composers
Winners of the Albert H. Maggs Composition Award
20th-century British male musicians
21st-century British male musicians